A Son Is Born is a 1946 Australian melodrama directed by Eric Porter and starring Ron Randell, Peter Finch, and Muriel Steinbeck.

Synopsis
In 1920, Laurette marries an irresponsible drifter, Paul Graham. They have a son, David, but later divorce due to Paul's drinking and infidelities. David chooses to stay with his father and Laurette marries again, this time to John, a rich businessman with a teenaged daughter, Kay.

Years later Paul is killed in a car accident and David comes to live with his mother, John and Kay. To get revenge on his mother for "abandoning" his father, David seduces Kay into marriage and abandons her, but realises the error of his ways serving in New Guinea during World War II. He is injured in battle but survives to be reunited with Kay, Laurette and John.

Cast
Muriel Steinbeck as Laurette Graham
Ron Randell as David Graham
Peter Finch as Paul Graham
John McCallum as John Seldon
Jane Holland as Kay Seldon
Kitty Bluett as Phyllis
Peter Dunstan as David Graham as a boy

Production
The script was written by Gloria Bourner, who was a cartoonist. Eric Porter storyboarded the entire film prior to filming. He also put up half the budget himself, with the balance coming from Charles Munro and some private investors.

Peter Finch, Ron Randell, Muriel Steinbeck and John McCallum were all well established actors when the film was made. Jane Holland was a 22-year-old radio actor who later moved to England and married Leo McKern. Kitty Bluett was a musical comedy star, the daughter of comedian Fred Bluett.

The film was shot in the Supreme Sound System studio in early 1945. Filming was scheduled to allow the actors to take radio and stage jobs, and sometimes would start at midnight. War footage shot by Damien Parer is used in the New Guinea sequences.

The movie was shot prior to Smithy (1946), also starring Randell and Steinbeck, but its release was held off until after that bigger budget movie to take advantage of its publicity.

Reception
Ron Randell was mobbed by female fans at the film's premiere. Critical response was mixed, many comparing the film unfavourably with Smithy.

Reviewer Stephen Vagg later wrote "This is a perfectly fine soapie, with Steinbeck suffering and smiling through the tears. She has beauty and charisma and holds her own against three men who would all become major names." Vagg characterised Randell's performance as "charismatic, vicious, cruel... a great performance... [that] established Randell as a force to watch."

Box Office
Eric Porter later claimed the film made £27,000 at the Australian box office but that he had trouble selling it to Australian television.

References

External links
 
 
 
A Son is Born at National Film and Sound Archive
Complete copy of script at National Archives of Australia
A Son is Born at Oz Movies

1946 films
Australian black-and-white films
Australian drama films
1946 drama films
1940s Australian films